Cerro Santiago is one of the most prominent cinder cones of a volcanic field surrounding the city of Jutiapa in southern Guatemala.

See also 
List of volcanoes in Guatemala

References 
 

Santiago
Santiago